Maro Makashvili (25 August 1901 – 19 February 1921) was a young Georgian woman who was killed during the 1921 Red Army invasion of Georgia. In 2015, she was the first woman to be awarded the Georgian Order of National Hero.

Makashvili was born in a family of the Georgian nobility. Her father Konstantine Makashvili was a poet and her maternal grandmother was the writer Ekaterine Gabashvili. Maro Makashvili was a student at the Tbilisi State University when the Red Army launched its invasion of Georgia in February 1921. She volunteered as a nurse and was sent to Kojori along with the Georgian Regiment. She was killed by splinters from a shell two days later.

Immediately after her death Georgian poet Titsian Tabidze compared her to Joan of Arc in a newspaper article. In her honour, Zakaria Paliashvili used the name Maro for the heroine of his opera Daisi, which premiered in 1923. A park located off Gudiashvili street in Tbilisi is named after her.

From age 16 until her death, Makashvili kept a diary that is now part of the collection of the Tbilisi Museum of Literature. It has been published as a book.

References 

1901 births
1921 deaths
National Heroes of Georgia